Richard Whiting (born 20 December 1984), also known by the nickname "Superman", is an English former professional rugby league footballer who last played for the Toronto Wolfpack in the Kingstone Press Championship. Able to play in a variety of positions, he was considered a utility player.

Previously playing in the Championship for the Featherstone Rovers and the Leigh Centurions, he spent most of his professional career in the Super League with Hull FC, with whom he won the 2005 Challenge Cup, and was named Super League's Young Player of the Year in 2005.

Early life
Whiting was born in Featherstone, West Yorkshire, England, and he was a promising association football player as a youngster and was signed to a scholarship with Barnsley as a 16-year-old before deciding to pursue a career in rugby league.

Playing career

Featherstone Rovers
Whiting began his career with Featherstone Rovers in National League One, being named the league's Young Player of the Year in 2003, before moving to Super League club Hull.

Hull

Whiting joined Hull F.C. in 2004. In 2005 he made 24 appearances during the season and also won the league's Young Player of the Year. Whiting played for Hull at centre in the 2005 Challenge Cup final, scoring a try in the victory over Leeds. Hull reached the 2006 Super League Grand final against St. Helens, and Whiting played from the substitutes' bench in his side's 4-26 loss.

Whiting also represented England in three matches between 2004 and 2006.

Whiting continued to be a regular in the Hull FC team, filling in a multitude of roles and positions and earning a reputation as one of the most reliable players in the league. In 2014, he was awarded a testimonial to mark 10 years with the club.

Leigh
In 2016, Richard moved to Leigh on a 2-month loan after falling down the pecking order. He made his début for Leigh in the 24-20 win over London Broncos. In April 2016 Whiting signed for Leigh on a permanent basis, ending his 12-year stint at Hull.

Toronto
Whiting joined the Toronto Wolfpack ahead of their inaugural season.

References

External links

Toronto Wolfpack profile

1984 births
Living people
Doncaster R.L.F.C. players
England national rugby league team players
English rugby league players
Featherstone Rovers players
Hull F.C. players
Leigh Leopards players
Rugby league centres
Rugby league five-eighths
Rugby league fullbacks
Rugby league halfbacks
Rugby league locks
Rugby league players from Featherstone
Rugby league props
Rugby league second-rows
Rugby league utility players
Rugby league wingers
Toronto Wolfpack players